UCE may refer to:

 Ultra-conserved element, a type of conserved sequence of DNA
 Uganda Certificate of Education, a certificate awarded for completion of secondary school in Uganda
 Unsolicited commercial e-mail, a kind of e-mail spam
 Ultimate Collector’s Edition
  (Communist Unification of Spain), a Spanish political party
 Unit construction engine, a type of motorcycle engines

Universities
 University of Central England, now Birmingham City University
 Universidad Central del Ecuador (Central University of Ecuador), a national university in Ecuador
 Universidad Central del Este (Eastern Central University), a private institution in the Dominican Republic
 University College of Engineering, former name of Vir Surendra Sai University of Technology, in Burla, India
 University College of Engineering, Thodupuzha, a state university in Kerala state, India

See also
 University College of Engineering, Kakatiya University (KUCE), Kothagudem, India